Vilhelm Christian Holm  (September 28, 1820 - October 15, 1886) was a Danish composer.

Notable works 
La Ventana (1856)
Fjernt fra Danmark (1860)
Ponte molle (1866)
Livjægerne paa Amager (1871)
Et Æventyr i Billeder (1871)
Mandarinens Døtre (1873)
Weyses Minde (1874)
Fra det forrige Aarhundrede (1875

See also
List of Danish composers

References
This article was initially translated from the Danish Wikipedia.

Male composers
1820 births
1886 deaths
19th-century Danish composers
19th-century male musicians